In thermodynamics, a partial molar property is a quantity which describes the variation of an extensive property of a solution or mixture with changes in the molar composition of the mixture at constant temperature and pressure. It is the partial derivative of the extensive property with respect to the amount (number of moles) of the component of interest. Every extensive property of a mixture has a corresponding partial molar property.

Definition

The partial molar volume is broadly understood as the contribution that a component of a mixture makes to the overall volume of the solution. However, there is more to it than this:

When one mole of water is added to a  large volume of water at 25 °C, the volume increases by 18 cm3. The molar volume of pure water would thus be reported as 18 cm3 mol−1. However, addition of one mole of water to a large volume of pure ethanol results in an increase in volume of only 14 cm3. The reason that the increase is different is that the volume occupied by a given number of water molecules depends upon the identity of the surrounding molecules. The value 14 cm3 is said to be the partial molar volume of water in ethanol.

In general, the partial molar volume of a substance X in a mixture is the change in volume per mole of X added to the mixture.

The partial molar volumes of the components of a mixture vary with the composition of the mixture, because the environment of the molecules in the mixture changes with the composition. It is the changing molecular environment (and the consequent alteration of the interactions between molecules) that results in the thermodynamic properties of a mixture changing as its composition is altered.

For a mixture with q components, this is expressed as

Now if temperature T and pressure P are held constant,  is a homogeneous function of degree 1, since doubling the quantities of each component in the mixture will double . More generally, for any :

By Euler's first theorem for homogeneous functions, this implies

where  is the partial molar  of component  defined as:

By Euler's second theorem for homogeneous functions,  is a homogeneous function of degree 0 (i.e., is an intensive property) which means that for any :

In particular, taking  where , one has

where  is the concentration expressed as the mole fraction of component .
Since the molar fractions satisfy the relation

the xi are not independent, and the partial molar property is a function of only  mole fractions:

The partial molar property is thus an intensive property - it does not depend on the size of the system.

The partial volume is not the partial molar volume.

Applications

Partial molar properties are useful because chemical mixtures are often maintained at constant temperature and pressure and under these conditions, the value of any extensive property can be obtained from its partial molar property. They are especially useful when considering specific properties of pure substances (that is, properties of one mole of pure substance) and properties of mixing (such as the heat of mixing or entropy of mixing). By definition, properties of mixing are related to those of the pure substances by:

Here  denotes a pure substance,  the mixing property, and  corresponds to the specific property under consideration. From the definition of partial molar properties,

substitution yields:

So from knowledge of the partial molar properties, deviation of properties of mixing from single components can be calculated.

Relationship to thermodynamic potentials

Partial molar properties satisfy relations analogous to those of the extensive properties.  For the internal energy U, enthalpy H, Helmholtz free energy A, and Gibbs free energy G, the following hold:

where  is the pressure,  the volume,  the temperature, and  the entropy.

Differential form of the thermodynamic potentials

The thermodynamic potentials also satisfy

where  is the chemical potential defined as (for constant nj with j≠i):

This means that the partial molar Gibbs free energy and the chemical potential, one of the most important properties in thermodynamics and chemistry, are the same quantity. Under isobaric (constant P) and isothermal (constant T ) conditions,  knowledge of the chemical potentials, yields every property of the mixture as they completely determine the Gibbs free energy.

Measuring partial molar properties

After sampling the compositions of interest one can fit a curve to the experimental data. This function will be .
Differentiating with respect to  will give .
 is then obtained from the relation:

Relation to apparent molar quantities
The relation between partial molar properties and the apparent ones can be derived from the definition of the apparent quantities and of the molality.

The relation holds also for multicomponent mixtures, just that in this case subscript i is required.

See also
Apparent molar property
Ideal solution
Excess molar quantity
Partial specific volume
Thermodynamic activity

References

Further reading 

 P. Atkins and J. de Paula, "Atkins' Physical Chemistry" (8th edition, Freeman 2006), chap.5
 T. Engel and P. Reid, "Physical Chemistry" (Pearson Benjamin-Cummings 2006), p. 210
 K.J. Laidler and J.H. Meiser, "Physical Chemistry" (Benjamin-Cummings 1982), p. 184-189
 P. Rock, "Chemical Thermodynamics" (MacMillan 1969), chap.9
 Ira Levine, "Physical Chemistry" (6th edition,McGraw Hill 2009),p.125-128

External links
Lecture notes from the University of Arizona detailing mixtures, partial molar quantities, and ideal solutions[archive]
On-line calculator for densities and partial molar volumes of aqueous solutions of some common electrolytes and their mixtures, at temperatures up to 323.15 K.

Physical chemistry
Thermodynamic properties
Chemical thermodynamics